Karl Erik Tore Johansson (19 October 1902 or 1903; sources differ – 12 May 1971), better known by the stage name Tor Johnson, was a Swedish professional wrestler and actor. As an actor, Johnson appeared in many B-movies, including some famously directed by Ed Wood. In professional wrestling, Johnson was billed as Tor Johnson and Super Swedish Angel.

Early life
Johnson was born on 19 October 1903 in Brännkyrka, Stockholms län, Sweden, the son of Karl Johan Johansson and Lovisa Kristina Pettersson. His death certificate and grave list 1903 as the year of his birth, contradicting published genealogy records.

Career
He had a full head of blonde hair, but shaved it to maintain an imposing and villainous appearance in his wrestling and acting work. He began getting bit parts in films upon moving to California, usually as the strongman or weightlifter, as early as 1934. In the same year, Johnson was one of over 50 wrestlers who took part in a two-month Los Angeles tournament for California's version of the world title. His film career ended in the early 1960s, after he appeared in a string of low-budget, poorly-rated films. However, he continued to make appearances on television and made a number of commercials.

Tor Johnson used the ring name Super Swedish Angel to distinguish himself from Nils Phillip Olafsson who used the ring name Swedish Angel. The name was derived from wrestler Maurice Tillet, known as the French Angel.

During his career as an actor, Johnson befriended director Ed Wood, who directed him in a number of films, including Bride of the Monster and Plan 9 from Outer Space; writing for Turner Classic Movies, film critic Donald Liebenson described Johnson's performance in Plan 9 as "gonzo." Johnson was very friendly to work with; actress Valda Hansen, who worked with Johnson in 1959's Night of the Ghouls, described him as "like a big sugar bun." During this period, Johnson appeared as a guest contestant on the quiz show You Bet Your Life, during which he showed the show's host, Groucho Marx, his "scariest face." Marx ran off the stage in mock terror, then returned and pleaded: "Don't make that face again!"

Death and legacy

Johnson died of heart failure in San Fernando, California, at the age of 68. He was buried at Eternal Valley Memorial Park, in Santa Clarita, California.

Johnson was portrayed by wrestler George "The Animal" Steele in Tim Burton's film Ed Wood (1994).

Johnson was featured extensively in the early work of cartoonist Drew Friedman, where Johnson was depicted as "Tor", a slow-witted, white-eyed lummox based on Johnson's persona in Ed Wood's films. The first of the one-page comics, "Tor Johnson at Home", was published in a 1981 issue of Robert Crumb's Weirdo, and the original artwork was purchased by television writer and producer Eddie Gorodetsky.

A latex mask based on Johnson's face, sculpted by Pat Newman for Don Post Studios, is described as "the best-selling Halloween horror mask of the late 1960s-early 1970s".

Filmography

Film

Television

References

External links

1900s births
1971 deaths
20th-century Swedish male actors
Sportspeople from Stockholm
Swedish male film actors
Swedish male professional wrestlers
Swedish male television actors
Swedish emigrants to the United States
Sportspeople from Los Angeles
Professional wrestlers from California